The following railroads operate or once operated in the District of Columbia.

Current railroads

Freight 
 CSX Transportation (CSXT)

Passenger 
 Amtrak (AMTK)

Commuter 
 MARC Train (MARC)
 Virginia Railway Express (VREX)
 Washington Metro

Defunct railroads

Electric 

 Alexandria, Barcroft and Washington Transit Company
 Anacostia and Potomac River Railroad
 Baltimore and Ocean City Railway
 Baltimore and Washington Transit Company
 Brightwood Railway
 Capital Traction Company
 Capital Transit Company
 Capitol, North O Street and South Washington Railway
 City and Suburban Railway
 Columbia Railway
 Georgetown and Tennallytown Railway
 Great Falls and Old Dominion Railroad
 Metropolitan Railroad
 Rock Creek Railway
 Tennallytown and Rockville Railroad
 Washington and Georgetown Railroad
 Washington and Glen Echo Railroad
 Washington and Great Falls Electric Railway
 Washington and Old Dominion Railway
 Washington and Rockville Railway
 Washington, Baltimore and Annapolis Electric Railroad
 Washington, Baltimore and Annapolis Electric Railway
 Washington, Berwyn and Laurel Electric Railway
 Washington Interurban Railway
 Washington Railway and Electric Company
 Washington, Spa Springs and Gretta Railroad
 Washington Traction and Electric Company
 Washington–Virginia Railway
 Washington, Woodside and Forest Glen Railway and Power Company

Notes

Further reading 
 Timeline of Washington, D.C. Railroad History

References 
 Federal and Local Legislation Relating to Canals and Steam Railroads in the District of Columbia, 1802-1903

Railroads
 
 
Washington D.C.